Dubnium (105Db) is a synthetic element, thus a standard atomic weight cannot be given. Like all synthetic elements, it has no stable isotopes. The first isotope to be synthesized was 261Db in 1968. The 13 known radioisotopes  are from 255Db to 270Db, and 1–3 isomers. The longest-lived known isotope is 268Db with a half-life of 16 hours.

List of isotopes 

|-
| rowspan=2|255Db
| rowspan=2 style="text-align:right" | 105
| rowspan=2 style="text-align:right" | 150
| rowspan=2|255.10707(45)#
| rowspan=2|
| α (~50%)
| 251Lr
| rowspan=2|
|-
| SF (~50%)
| (various)
|- 
| rowspan=3|256Db
| rowspan=3 style="text-align:right" | 105
| rowspan=3 style="text-align:right" | 151
| rowspan=3|256.10789(26)#
| rowspan=3|1.9(4) s[]
| α (~64%)
| 252Lr
| rowspan=3|
|-
| SF (~0.02%)
| (various)
|-
| β+ (~36%)
| 256Rf
|-
| rowspan=3|257Db
| rowspan=3 style="text-align:right" | 105
| rowspan=3 style="text-align:right" | 152
| rowspan=3|257.10758(22)#
| rowspan=3|1.53(17) s[]
| α (>94%)
| 253Lr
| rowspan=3|(9/2+)
|-
| SF (<6%)
| (various)
|-
| β+ (1%)
| 257Rf
|-
| rowspan=3 style="text-indent:1em" | 257mDb
| rowspan=3 colspan="3" style="text-indent:2em" | 140(100)# keV
| rowspan=3|0.67(6) s
| α (>87%)
| 253Lr
| rowspan=3|(1/2−)
|-
| SF (<13%)
| (various)
|-
| β+ (1#%)
| 257Rf
|-
| rowspan=3|258Db
| rowspan=3 style="text-align:right" | 105
| rowspan=3 style="text-align:right" | 153
| rowspan=3|258.10929(33)#
| rowspan=3|4.5(4) s
| α (64%)
| 254Lr
| rowspan=3|
|-
| β+ (36%)
| 258Rf
|-
| SF (<1%)
| (various)
|-
| rowspan=2 style="text-indent:1em" | 258mDb
| rowspan=2 colspan="3" style="text-indent:2em" | 60(100)# keV
| rowspan=2|1.9(5) s
| β+
| 258Rf
| rowspan=2|
|-
| IT (rare)
| 258Db
|-
| 259Db
| style="text-align:right" | 105
| style="text-align:right" | 154
| 259.10949(6)
| 0.51(16) s
| α
| 255Lr
|
|-
| rowspan=3|260Db
| rowspan=3 style="text-align:right" | 105
| rowspan=3 style="text-align:right" | 155
| rowspan=3|260.1113(1)#
| rowspan=3|1.52(13) s
| α (>90.4%)
| 256Lr
| rowspan=3|
|-
| SF (<9.6%)
| (various)
|-
| β+ (<2.5%)
| 260Rf
|-
| style="text-indent:1em" | 260mDb
| colspan="3" style="text-indent:2em" | 200(150)# keV
| 19 s
|
|
|
|-
| rowspan=2|261Db
| rowspan=2 style="text-align:right" | 105
| rowspan=2 style="text-align:right" | 156
| rowspan=2|261.11192(12)#
| rowspan=2|4.5(1.1) s
| SF (73%)
| (various)
| rowspan=2|
|-
| α (27%)
| 257Lr
|-
| rowspan=3|262Db
| rowspan=3 style="text-align:right" | 105
| rowspan=3 style="text-align:right" | 157
| rowspan=3|262.11407(15)#
| rowspan=3|35(5) s
| SF (~67%)
| (various)
| rowspan=3|
|-
| α (~30%)
| 258Lr
|-
| β+ (3#%)
| 262Rf
|-
| rowspan=3|263Db
| rowspan=3 style="text-align:right" | 105
| rowspan=3 style="text-align:right" | 158
| rowspan=3|263.11499(18)#
| rowspan=3|29(9) s[]
| SF (~56%)
| (various)
| rowspan=3|
|-
| α (~37%)
| 259Lr
|-
| β+ (~6.9%)
| 263Rf
|-
| rowspan=2|266Db
| rowspan=2 style="text-align:right" | 105
| rowspan=2 style="text-align:right" | 161
| rowspan=2|266.12103(30)#
| rowspan=2|
| SF
| (various)
| rowspan=2|
|-
| EC?
| 266Rf
|-
| rowspan=2|267Db
| rowspan=2 style="text-align:right" | 105
| rowspan=2 style="text-align:right" | 162
| rowspan=2|267.12247(44)#
| rowspan=2|
| SF
| (various)
| rowspan=2|
|-
| EC?
| 267Rf
|-
| rowspan=3|268Db
| rowspan=3 style="text-align:right" | 105
| rowspan=3 style="text-align:right" | 163
| rowspan=3|268.12567(57)#
| rowspan=3|
| α (51%)
| 264Lr
| rowspan=3|
|-
| SF (49%)
| (various)
|-
| EC?
| 268Rf
|-
| rowspan="3" | 270Db
| rowspan="3" style="text-align:right" | 105
| rowspan="3" style="text-align:right" | 165
| rowspan="3" | 270.13136(64)#
| rowspan="3" | 
| SF (~17%)
| (various)
| rowspan="3" |
|-
| α (~83%)
| 266Lr
|-
| EC? 
| 270Rf

Nucleosynthesis history

Cold fusion
This section deals with the synthesis of nuclei of dubnium by so-called "cold" fusion reactions. These are processes which create compound nuclei at low excitation energy (~10–20 MeV, hence "cold"), leading to a higher probability of survival from fission. The excited nucleus then decays to the ground state via the emission of one or two neutrons only.

209Bi(50Ti,xn)259−xDb (x=1,2,3)
The first attempts to synthesise dubnium using cold fusion reactions were performed in 1976 by the team at FLNR, Dubna using the above reaction. They were able to detect a 5 s spontaneous fission (SF) activity which they assigned to 257Db. This assignment was later corrected to 258Db.
In 1981, the team at GSI studied this reaction using the improved technique of correlation of genetic parent-daughter decays. They were able to positively identify258Db, the product from the 1n neutron evaporation channel.
In 1983, the team at Dubna revisited the reaction using the method of identification of a descendant using chemical separation. They succeeded in measuring alpha decays from known descendants of the decay chain beginning with 258Db. This was taken as providing some evidence for the formation of dubnium nuclei.
The team at GSI revisited the reaction in 1985 and were able to detect 10 atoms of 257Db. 
After a significant upgrade of their facilities in 1993, in 2000 the team measured 120 decays of 257Db, 16 decays of 256Db and decay of258Db in the measurement of the 1n, 2n and 3n excitation functions. The data gathered for 257Db allowed a first spectroscopic study of this isotope and identified an isomer, 257mDb, and a first determination of a decay level structure for 257Db. The reaction was used in spectroscopic studies of isotopes of mendelevium and einsteinium in 2003–2004.

209Bi(49Ti,xn)258−xDb (x=2?)
This reaction was studied by Yuri Oganessian and the team at Dubna in 1983. They observed a 2.6 s SF activity tentatively assigned to 256Db. Later results suggest a possible reassignment to 256Rf, resulting from the ~30% EC branch in 256Db.

209Bi(48Ti,xn)257−xDb (x=1?,2)
This reaction was studied by Yuri Oganessian and the team at Dubna in 1983. They observed a 1.6 s activity with a ~80% alpha branch with a ~20% SF branch. The activity was tentatively assigned to 255Db. Later results suggest a reassignment to 256Db. In 2005, the team at the University of Jyväskylä studied this reaction. They observed three atoms of 255Db with a cross section of 40 pb.

208Pb(51V,xn)259−xDb (x=1,2)
The team at Dubna also studied this reaction in 1976 and were again able to detect the 5 s SF activity, first tentatively assigned to 257Db and later to258Db.
In 2006, the team at LBNL reinvestigated this reaction as part of their odd-Z projectile program. They were able to detect 258Db and 257Db in their measurement of the 1n and 2n neutron evaporation channels.

207Pb(51V,xn)258−xDb
The team at Dubna also studied this reaction in 1976 but this time they were unable to detect the 5 s SF activity, first tentatively assigned to 257Db and later to 258Db. Instead, they were able to measure a 1.5 s SF activity, tentatively assigned to 255Db.

205Tl(54Cr,xn)259−xDb (x=1?)
The team at Dubna also studied this reaction in 1976 and were again able to detect the 5 s SF activity, first tentatively assigned to 257Db and later to258Db.

Hot fusion
This section deals with the synthesis of nuclei of dubnium by so-called "hot" fusion reactions. These are processes which create compound nuclei at high excitation energy (~40–50 MeV, hence "hot"), leading to a reduced probability of survival from fission and quasi-fission. The excited nucleus then decays to the ground state via the emission of 3–5 neutrons.

232Th(31P,xn)263−xDb (x=5)
There are very limited reports that this rare reaction using a P-31 beam was studied in 1989 by Andreyev et al. at the FLNR. One source suggests that no atoms were detected whilst a better source from the Russians themselves indicates that 258Db was synthesised in the 5n channel with a yield of 120 pb.

238U(27Al,xn)265−xDb (x=4,5)
In 2006, as part of their study of the use of uranium targets in superheavy element synthesis, the LBNL team led by Ken Gregorich studied the excitation functions for the 4n and 5n channels in this new reaction.

236U(27Al,xn)263−xDb (x=5,6)
This reaction was first studied by Andreyev et al. at the FLNR, Dubna in 1992. They were able to observe 258Db and 257Db in the 5n and 6n exit channels with yields of 450 pb and 75 pb, respectively.

243Am(22Ne,xn)265−xDb (x=5)
The first attempts to synthesis dubnium were performed in 1968 by the team at the Flerov Laboratory of Nuclear Reactions (FLNR) in Dubna, Russia. They observed two alpha lines which they tentatively assigned to 261Db and 260Db.
They repeated their experiment in 1970 looking for spontaneous fission. They found a 2.2 s SF activity which they assigned to 261Db. 
In 1970, the Dubna team began work on using gradient thermochromatography in order to detect dubnium in chemical experiments as a volatile chloride. In their first run they detected a volatile SF activity with similar adsorption properties to NbCl5 and unlike HfCl4. This was taken to indicate the formation of nuclei of dvi-niobium as DbCl5. In 1971, they repeated the chemistry experiment using higher sensitivity and observed alpha decays from an dvi-niobium component, taken to confirm the formation of 260105. The method was repeated in 1976 using the formation of bromides and obtained almost identical results, indicating the formation of a volatile, dvi-niobium-like DbBr5.

241Am(22Ne,xn)263−xDb (x=4,5)
In 2000, Chinese scientists at the Institute of Modern Physics (IMP), Lanzhou, announced the discovery of the previously unknown isotope 259Db formed in the 4n neutron evaporation channel. They were also able to confirm the decay properties for 258Db.

248Cm(19F,xn)267−xDb (x=4,5)
This reaction was first studied in 1999 at the Paul Scherrer Institute (PSI) in order to produce 262Db for chemical studies. Just 4 atoms were detected with a cross section of 260 pb.
Japanese scientists at JAERI studied the reaction further in 2002 and determined yields for the isotope 262Db during their efforts to study the aqueous chemistry of dubnium.

249Bk(18O,xn)267−xDb (x=4,5)
Following from the discovery of 260Db by Albert Ghiorso in 1970 at the University of California (UC), the same team continued in 1971 with the discovery of the new isotope 262Db. They also observed an unassigned 25 s SF activity, probably associated with the now-known SF branch of 263Db.
In 1990, a team led by Kratz at LBNL definitively discovered the new isotope 263Db in the 4n neutron evaporation channel.
This reaction has been used by the same team on several occasions in order to attempt to confirm an electron capture (EC) branch in 263Db leading to long-lived 263Rf (see rutherfordium).

249Bk(16O,xn)265−xDb (x=4)
Following from the discovery of 260Db by Albert Ghiorso in 1970 at the University of California (UC), the same team continued in 1971 with the discovery of the new isotope 261Db.

250Cf(15N,xn)265−xDb (x=4)
Following from the discovery of 260Db by Ghiorso in 1970 at LBNL, the same team continued in 1971 with the discovery of the new isotope 261Db.

249Cf(15N,xn)264−xDb (x=4)
In 1970, the team at the Lawrence Berkeley National Laboratory (LBNL) studied this reaction and identified the isotope 260Db in their discovery experiment. They used the modern technique of correlation of genetic parent-daughter decays to confirm their assignment.
In 1977, the team at Oak Ridge repeated the experiment and were able to confirm the discovery by the identification of K X-rays from the daughter lawrencium.

254Es(13C,xn)267−xDb
In 1988, scientists as the Lawrence Livermore National Laboratory (LLNL) used the asymmetric hot fusion reaction with an einsteinium-254 target to search for the new nuclides 264Db and 263Db. Due to the low sensitivity of the experiment caused by the small Es-254 target, they were unable to detect any evaporation residues (ER).

Decay of heavier nuclides
Isotopes of dubnium have also been identified in the decay of heavier elements. Observations to date are summarised in the table below:

Chronology of isotope discovery

Isomerism

260Db
Recent data on the decay of 272Rg has revealed that some decay chains continue through 260Db with extraordinary longer life-times than expected. These decays have been linked to an isomeric level decaying by alpha decay with a half-life of ~19 s. Further research is required to allow a definite assignment.

258Db
Evidence for an isomeric state in 258Db has been gathered from the study of the decay of 266Mt and 262Bh. It has been noted that those decays assigned to an electron capture (EC) branch has a significantly different half-life to those decaying by alpha emission. This has been taken to suggest the existence of an isomeric state decaying by EC with a half-life of ~20 s. Further experiments are required to confirm this assignment.

257Db
A study of the formation and decay of 257Db has proved the existence of an isomeric state. Initially, 257Db was taken to decay by alpha emission with energies 9.16, 9.07 and 8.97 MeV. A measurement of the correlations of these decays with those of 253Lr have shown that the 9.16 MeV decay belongs to a separate isomer. Analysis of the data in conjunction with theory have assigned this activity to a meta stable state, 257mDb. The ground state decays by alpha emission with energies 9.07 and 8.97 MeV. Spontaneous fission of 257m,gDb was not confirmed in recent experiments.

Spectroscopic decay level schemes

257Db

Chemical yields of isotopes

Cold fusion
The table below provides cross-sections and excitation energies for cold fusion reactions producing dubnium isotopes directly. Data in bold represents maxima derived from excitation function measurements. + represents an observed exit channel.

Hot fusion
The table below provides cross-sections and excitation energies for hot fusion reactions producing dubnium isotopes directly. Data in bold represents maxima derived from excitation function measurements. + represents an observed exit channel.

References 

 Isotope masses from:

 Isotopic compositions and standard atomic masses from:

 Half-life, spin, and isomer data selected from the following sources.

 
Dubnium
Dubnium